The Georgian Institute of Public Affairs (GIPA) was created in 1994 in Tbilisi, Georgia. Four separate schools of the Institute offer MA, BA programs and training courses in the spheres of Public Affairs, Local Governance, Journalism, International Affairs and Law, as well as a PhD program in the social sciences. GIPA is considered one of the top three universities in Georgia, alongside the Free University of Tbilisi and Tbilisi State University.

The Georgian Institute of Public Affairs is a national center for development of practices in Public Administration, Law, Politics and Journalism. Since its establishment, GIPA brought together leaders from business, media, civil society and public services to contribute to developing effective governance at state, municipal and local levels as well as independent and viable media in Georgia through interactive education programs, research and training.

The university is governed by a board, some of which are appointed by the existing members whereas others are elected by the university academic board. The board also appoints the rector, who, as an executive director of the university, is responsible for its strategic development. Previous directors of GIPA include Giorgi Margvelashvili.

Apart from graduate degree and certified training programs, GIPA carries out many research and training projects. It also publishes student newspaper "Brosse Street Journal" and manages the first English-language and student run Radio GIPA.

There are four schools and two programs at GIPA 

School of Government
Caucasus School of Journalism and Media Management
School of Law and Politics
School of Social Sciences
PhD Program in Social Sciences
Georgian Rural Development Department

Notable alumni 
Davit Bakradze
Archil Talakvadze
Tamar Sanikidze
Guram Sherozia 
Zurab Japaridze

References

External links
Official website of GIPA
Official website of GIPA's School of Government (SG)
Official website of GIPA's School of Law and Politics (SLP)
Official website of GIPA's Caucasus School of Journalism and Media Management (CSJMM)
Official website of GIPA's School of Social Sciences (SSS)
Section about GIPA's Doctoral Program in Social Sciences
Official website of GIPA's Georgian Rural Development Program (GRDP)

Education in Tbilisi
1994 establishments in Georgia (country)
Educational institutions established in 1994
Georgian Institute of Public Affairs